Monoethnicity is the existence of a single ethnic group in a given region or country. It is the opposite of polyethnicity.

An example of a largely monoethnic country is Japan. It is a common belief in Japan that the entire country is monoethnic, but a few ethnic minorities live in Japan (e.g. Koreans, Ainus and Ryukyuans). They represent around 1% of the whole population.

South Korea is a monoethnic country. There are small ethnic minorities that exist in South Korea, where they account for around 1% of the South Korean population. These include around 650,000 Chinese immigrants.

Most Sub-Saharan African countries have what would be considered a mono-racial society, but it is common to find dozens of ethnic groups within the same country.

The Yugoslav Wars are noted as having made Yugoslavia's successor states "de facto and de jure monoethnic nation-states", with Bosnia and Herzegovina further diving itself into mono-ethnic enclaves.

Monoethnic countries with more than 85%

Sovereign states

Unrecognized states and dependent territories

See also 
Ethnic cleansing
Ethnic nationalism
Ethnostate
Homogeneous
Titular nation

References 

Ethnicity